Tounj is a village and a municipality in Karlovac County, Croatia. 
In the 2011 census, the total population was 1,150, in the following settlements:
 Gerovo Tounjsko, population 55
 Kamenica Skradnička, population 266
 Potok Tounjski, population 71
 Rebrovići, population 184
 Tounj, population 346
 Tržić Tounjski, population 18
 Zdenac, population 210

In the 2011 census, 98% of the inhabitants were Croats.

References

External links

 

Municipalities of Croatia
Populated places in Karlovac County